The Giant's Castle is a promontory fort of the Iron Age, on St Mary's, Isles of Scilly, England. It is a scheduled monument.

Description
The fort is situated in the south-east of St Mary's, near St Mary's Airport and on the edge of Salakee Down.

During the Second World War, a practice firing target for military aircraft was made in the western end of the outermost rampart. Fragments of early Iron Age pottery were recovered from cuttings made by the army.

See also
 Hillforts in Britain
 Promontory forts of Cornwall

References

Hill forts in Cornwall
Scheduled monuments in Cornwall
St Mary's, Isles of Scilly